Saleh Chihadeh (born 25 August 1994) is a Palestinian footballer who plays as a forward for Swiss 1. Liga club Naters. He also holds Swiss citizenship.

Club career
On 31 January 2022, Chihadeh joined Future in Egypt.

International career
Chihadeh was born in Safuriye near Nazareth, and moved to Switzerland at the age of 7. He made his debut for the Palestine national football team in a friendly 2-1 win over Pakistan.

International goals

References

External links
 
 

1994 births
Living people
Palestinian footballers
Palestine international footballers
Association football forwards
FC Thun players
SC Kriens players
Future FC (Egypt) players
Swiss Super League players
Swiss Challenge League players
Footballers from Northern District (Israel)
People from Tzippori
Israeli expatriate footballers
Palestinian expatriate footballers
Expatriate footballers in Switzerland
Expatriate footballers in Egypt
Israeli expatriate sportspeople in Switzerland
Palestinian expatriate sportspeople in Switzerland
Palestinian expatriate sportspeople in Egypt